German submarine U-845 was a Type IXC/40 U-boat built for Nazi Germany's Kriegsmarine during World War II.

Design
German Type IXC/40 submarines were slightly larger than the original Type IXCs. U-845 had a displacement of  when at the surface and  while submerged. She had two shafts and two  propellers.

U-845 was fitted with six  torpedo tubes (four fitted at the bow and two at the stern), 22 torpedoes, one  SK C/32 naval gun, 180 rounds, and a  SK C/30 as well as a  C/30 anti-aircraft gun. The boat had a complement of forty-eight.

Service history
U-845 was ordered on 20 January 1941 from DeSchiMAG AG Weser in Bremen under the yard number 1051. Her keel was laid down on 20 June 1942. The U-boat was launched the following year on 18 January 1943. she was commissioned into service under the command of Kapitänleutnant Udo Behrens (Crew 30) in 4th U-boat Flotilla on 1 May 1943.

On 3 July 1943, Kapitänleutnant Rudolf Hoffmann (Crew 36) took over command. On her way to Gotenhafen U-845 assisted  which was unable to dive and escorted her to port where they arrived on 24 July. Hoffmann handed over command to Korvettenkapitän Werner Weber (Crew 25) on 8 October 1943. On 1 January 1944 U-845, which had been transferred to the 10th U-boat Flotilla, left for operations in the North Atlantic. Via Kristiansand, Stavanger and Bergen she reached her assigned operation area off Newfoundland in February 1944. On 14 February the U-boat was spotted by an aircraft. In the subsequent attack one crew member died and two others were wounded. An attack on another unescorted freighter the next day failed to sink the ship. On 10 March 1944, U-845 made contact with convoy SC 154, but was picked up by an escort, in the late afternoon and depth-charged. The rest of the crew survived the attack and was picked up by the escorts. Swansea picked up 23, Forester 17, and St. Laurent five men.

Summary of raiding history

References

Bibliography

External links

World War II submarines of Germany
German Type IX submarines
1943 ships
U-boats commissioned in 1943
U-boats scuttled in 1944
Ships built in Bremen (state)
Maritime incidents in March 1944